"Tukituki Te Manawa" ("Fluttering Heart") is a song by New Zealand band Drax Project, performed in Māori language. It was the band's second song released as a part of the Waiata / Anthems project, with their first being a re-release of their 2017 single "Woke Up Late" for the 2019 Waiata / Anthems compilation album. An unreleased song by the band originally written in English, "Tukituki Te Manawa" translated into Māori by Hinewehi Mohi and Sir Tīmoti Kāretu and released on Christmas Day 2020. In 2021, the song was the subject of an episode of a TVNZ OnDemand documentary series, documenting the creation of music for Waiata / Anthems.

The song debuted at number 10 on the New Zealand Hot Singles chart. By the end of 2021, it was the 17th most successful Te Reo Māori song of the year in New Zealand.

Background and composition

In September 2019, Drax Project took part in Waiata / Anthems, a compilation album of contemporary New Zealand music re-interpreted in Te Reo Māori. They performed "I Moeroa", a re-recording of the band's 2017 single "Woke Up Late" translated by Sir Tīmoti Kāretu and Jeremy Tātere MacLeod. The team behind the production of "I Moeroa" contacted Drax Project after its release, to work on a second song.

"Tukituki Te Manawa" was based on a previously unreleased song by the band, called "Take My Breath Away", which was originally written several years before but otherwise unreleased by the band. Musician Jerome Kavanagh recorded taonga pūoro (traditional  musical instruments) for the song, including pūtātara and kōauau.

The recording process behind "Tukituki Te Manawa" was the feature of an episode of a TVNZ OnDemand documentary series following the creation of music sung in Te Reo Māori for Waiata / Anthems, which was released on 1 May 2021.

Credits and personnel
Credits adapted from Tidal and YouTube.

Matthew David Beveridge Beachen – composer, lyricist, drums
Chris Chetland – mastering engineer
Leonardo Coghini – additional keyboards
Drax Project – producer, engineer
Simon Gooding – mixing
Jerome Kavanagh – taonga pūoro
Hinewehi Mohi – composer, lyricist, translation and interpretation
Benjamin Daniel Harold O'Leary – composer, lyricist, guitar
Shaan Singh – composer, lyricist, vocalist
Samuel Jacob Henry Thomson – composer, lyricist, bass
Sir Tīmoti Kāretu – composer, lyricist, translation and interpretation

Charts

Year-end charts

References

2020 singles
2020 songs
Drax Project songs
Māori-language songs
New Zealand songs
Songs written by Hinewehi Mohi